Sinești is a commune in Iași County, Western Moldavia, Romania. It is composed of four villages: Bocnița, Osoi, Sinești and Stornești.

Natives
Rudi Prisăcaru

References

Communes in Iași County
Localities in Western Moldavia